The Launceston Football Club, nicknamed The Blues, is an Australian rules football club, located in the West Tamar suburb of Riverside, seven kilometres north of the Launceston CBD and currently play in the Tasmanian State League in Tasmania, Australia.

Club origins

History
Home ground – Windsor Park (1968–present)
Established – 1875 (merged with Tamar Rowing Club in 1888 and Union Football Club in 1889)
Playing colours – Navy blue and white
Emblem – Blues
Club motto – "Volumus vincere" ("The will to win")
Club theme song – "Onwards to Victory" (Tune: "Notre Dame March")
Affiliations – Northern FA (1882–1885), NTFA (1886–1986), NTFL (1987–1993), TFL (1994–1997), NTFL (1998–2008), TSL (2009–present)

Premierships
 Northern Tasmanian Football Association (26): 1888, 1889, 1892, 1893, 1894, 1897, 1899, 1900, 1909, 1913, 1920, 1924, 1926, 1929, 1933, 1934, 1935, 1936, 1937, 1938, 1940, 1945, 1951, 1969, 1976, 1985
 Northern Tasmanian Football League (3): 2006, 2007, 2008
 Tasmanian Football League (4): 2011, 2020, 2021, 2022
 Tasmanian State Premierships (5): 1933, 1934, 1935, 1937, 1938

Individual medal winners
Tasman Shields Trophy winners (NTFA) 
 1928 – N. Edwards
 1929 – J. Milbourne
 1933 – K. W. "Bill" Cahill
 1936 – K. W. "Bill" Cahill
 1939 – Tom Ryan
 1946 – Lance Crosswell
 1947 – Lance Crosswell
 1951 – Darrell Crosswell
 1959 – Bob Bye
 1960 – Bob Bye

Hec Smith Memorial Medal winners 
 1968 – Alby Dunn
 1976 – Paul Ellis
 1980 – Grant Alford
 1986 – D. Cook

William Leitch Medal winners 
 Nil

Alistair Lynch Medal (Previously the "Tassie Medal") Winners 
 2011 – Tim Bristow

Darrel Baldock Medal winners 
 2003 – Adam Sanders (NTFL)
 2004 – Anthony Taylor (NTFL)
 2005 – Brian Finch (NTFL)

Competition leading goalkickers
NTFA leading goalkickers 
 1889 – H. Murray (9)
 1892 – P. Tabart (9)
 1893 – R. Lawrence (11)
 1894 – R. Lawrence (12)
 1896 – J. Gorman (16)
 1900 – P. Bird (15)
 1905 – S. Willett (8)
 1906 – Viv Valentine (12)
 1911 – A. Ramsay (6) and R. Thomas (6)
 1925 – B. Freeland (25)
 1930 – J. Foley (70)
 1931 – J. Foley (52)
 1933 – H. Ranson (62)
 1935 – A. Waddle (44)
 1937 – L. Smith (59)
 1938 – L. Smith (73)
 1945 – M. Flood (71)
 1948 – Ross McCrimmon (102)
 1949 – Ross McCrimmon (83)
 1950 – Ross McCrimmon (76)
 1951 – Ross McCrimmon (55)
 1955 – C. Tabe (67)
 1967 – Dennis Seen (50)
 1969 – Tony West (65)
 1970 – Tony West (50)
 1976 – Bob Smith (94)
 1977 – Bob Smith (63)
 1978 – Ian Donnachy (63)
 1982 – Ian Donnachy (78)

NTFL leading goalkickers
 2005 – Adam Derbyshire (93)
 2006 – Adam Derbyshire (133)
 2008 – Adam Derbyshire (133)

Tasmanian State League leading goalkickers
 2010 – Brian Finch (94)
 2011 – Brian Finch (104)
 2013 - Sonny Whiting (85)
 2018 - Mitch Thorp (62)
 2020 - Dylan Riley (38)

Senior coaches

Club records
Club record score 
 46.18 (294) v Deloraine 10.11 (71) – 1984

Most goals in a match 
 A. Derbyshire (18) v Penguin – 2008

Most goals in a season 
 A. Derbyshire (140) – 2008

Club record goalkicker (all-time)
 A. Derbyshire (676) from 2000 to 2009; 2012

Club record games holder 
 Beau Green (256) from 1999 to 2014Club record match attendance'''
 8,617 – Launceston v Longford at York Park (1957 NTFA Grand Final)

Notable players
There is a list of past and present Launceston players who have played at AFL/VFL:

 Grant Allford (Richmond)
 Roy Apted (St Kilda)
 Bruce Armstrong (1943–2004) (Essendon)
 Tom Bellchambers (Essendon)
 Jack Beveridge (1907–1986) (Collingwood)
 Paul Bryce (North Melbourne, Melbourne and Sydney Swans)
 Bill Cahill (1911–1966) (Essendon)
 George Challis (1891–1916) (Carlton)
 Alan Crawford (1916–1988) (North Melbourne)
 Darren Davies (Footscray and St Kilda)
 Craig Davis (Carlton, North Melbourne, Collingwood and Sydney Swans)
 Harden Dean (1913–1982) (Melbourne)
 John Delanty (St Kilda)
 Alby Dunn (1941–2009) (South Melbourne)
 Robert Dutton (Carlton and Hawthorn)
 Phil Garwood (1939–2011) (Hawthorn)
 Arthur Hinman (1890–1915) (University)
 Lou Holmes (1892–1915) (St Kilda)
 Colin Jackson (1906–1977) (Melbourne)
 Maurie Johnson (1907–2000) (Carlton and South Melbourne)
 Chayce Jones (Adelaide)

 Jake Kolodjashnij (Geelong)
 Kade Kolodjashnij (Gold Coast)
 Harry Lakin (1897–1978) (South Melbourne and St Kilda)
 Graeme Lee (St Kilda)
 Jesse Lonergan (Gold Coast)
 Sam Lonergan (Essendon and Richmond)
 Harry Long (1910–2003) (Melbourne)
 Roy Long (1914–1985) (Hawthorn)
 Harry Luck (1876–1923) (St Kilda)
 Allan Lynch (Fitzroy)
 Stanley McKenzie (1890–1915) (Carlton)
 Tim Mohr (GWS)
 Kevin Northcote (1938–2008) (Hawthorn)
 Alf Oldham (1899–1972) (Carlton)
 Trevor Ranson (1912–1996) (St Kilda)
 Eric Richardson (1891–1969) (St Kilda)
 Jackson Thurlow (Geelong)
 Len Toyne (1922–1998) (Geelong, Fitzroy and Melbourne)
 Viv Valentine (1887–1967) (Carlton)
 Ken Walker (1919–2013) (St Kilda)
 Graham Wise (Melbourne)

Club song
The club song is sung to the tune of Notre Dame Victory March

References

External links

Official website
Launceston FC on Full Points Footy website

Australian rules football clubs in Tasmania
1875 establishments in Australia
Sport in Launceston, Tasmania
Australian rules football clubs established in 1875
Tasmanian Football League clubs
North West Football League clubs